The Murători is a right tributary of the river Becaș in Romania. It flows into the Becaș close to its confluence with the Someșul Mic, in the eastern outskirts of Cluj-Napoca.

References

Rivers of Romania
Rivers of Cluj County